Thieves and Liars is a 2006 Puerto Rican film directed by Ricardo Méndez Matta. It was Puerto Rico's submission to the 79th Academy Awards for the Academy Award for Best Foreign Language Film, but was not accepted as a nominee.

Plot
The film is set in the island of Puerto Rico. Because of its central location in the Caribbean, the island has become one of the main ports of drug entry from South America into the United States. The film follows the lives of three families in different levels of society affected by drug trafficking and crime in the island.

Cast
 Steven Bauer as Oscar 
 Isidro Bobadilla as Peña 
 Elpidia Carrillo as Isabel 
 José Heredia as Migue 
 Daniel Lugo as Carmona 
 Dennis Mario as Luijan 
 Lymari Nadal as Marisol 
 Carlos Paniagua as Luisito 
 Magda Rivera as Wanda 
 Luz María Rondón as Doña Norma 
 Alba Raquel Barros
 Vico C

See also
Cinema of Puerto Rico
List of submissions to the 79th Academy Awards for Best Foreign Language Film
List of Puerto Ricans in the Academy Awards

References

External links

Film info in La Butaca
Film info in Cine Las Americas

2006 films
Puerto Rican films
2006 crime drama films